The Judicial Circuits Act of 1866 (ch. 210) reorganized the United States circuit courts and provided for the gradual elimination of several seats on the Supreme Court of the United States. It was signed into law on July 23, 1866, by President Andrew Johnson. It in effect denied him the opportunity of appointing any justices to the Supreme Court. It was the first major legislation dealing with the judiciary following the American Civil War.

The Act redrew the boundaries of the judicial circuits and reduced the number of circuits from ten to nine. It also provided for the gradual reduction in the number of seats on the Supreme Court from the ten that had been authorized in 1863 to seven and established in large measure the geographical outlines of the circuits ever since.

As it happened, only two seats, those of John Catron and James Moore Wayne, were abolished during the brief three-year interval of the Act's efficacy, before being superseded by the Judiciary Act of 1869. Thus, it never actually happened that the Court was reduced to seven in accordance with the language of the 1866 Act; rather, while it was in effect the Court comprised first nine and then eight justices. With the 1869 Act, Congress set the size of the Supreme Court at a total of nine justices once again. However, because Robert Cooper Grier created another vacancy in 1870 before a ninth justice could be appointed to the Court, the Court's de facto strength was actually reduced to the seven that had been stipulated by the 1866 Act, albeit shortly after that Act was no longer in force. Eventually, Grier was replaced by William Strong, and Joseph P. Bradley was installed in the lately created seat, restoring the Court to its new de jure strength of nine.

The subsequent stability in circuit organization ended a period of frequent rearrangement of the states within the circuits. After establishing nine circuits in 1837, Congress in 1842 shifted several southern states in order to accommodate transportation routes used by the justices when traveling on circuit. In 1862 Congress incorporated six additional states into a restructured system of nine circuits, and within another year had abolished the California Circuit, placed California and Oregon in a Tenth Circuit, and reorganized the mid-western states. The 1866 Act ended a period in which the arrangement of the states into circuits was frequently reorganized. Since then, the geographical outline of the circuits has only been altered by the addition of new states to circuits and the division of two large circuits in the twentieth century. 

The geographical reorganization of the circuits in 1866 coincided with the broader effort of the Republican majority in Congress to reduce what it considered the disproportionate influence enjoyed by the southern states before the Civil War. Between 1837 and 1862, five of the nine circuits comprised exclusively slave states. The tradition of appointing a justice from each circuit allowed Southern slaveowners to dominate the Supreme Court. After reducing the number of all-southern circuits in 1862, Congress in 1866 left only two circuits that comprised only former slave states, and only one that comprised only former Confederate states.

The reduction in the size of the Supreme Court nullified the pending nomination of Henry Stanbery to the tenth seat on the Court and prevented President Andrew Johnson from appointing a justice during the remainder of his term. The legislation owed less to the Republican opposition and to Johnson, who signed the act, than to the efforts of Chief Justice Salmon P. Chase. The first draft of the bill proposed a return to nine justices, thus preventing tie votes on the Court and providing a justice for each circuit. In private communication with influential members of Congress and fellow justices, Chase urged a further reduction in the number of seats in hopes of winning approval for an increase in the justices' salaries. Congress did not approve an increase in judicial salaries until 1871, after it had returned the size of the Court to nine seats.

References

''Portions of this article based on public domain text from the Federal Judicial Center.

Further reading

1866 in American law
United States federal judiciary legislation
History of the Supreme Court of the United States
39th United States Congress